Leptothele chang is a species of spider in the family Euagridae native to Thailand.

References

Euagridae
Spiders described in 2020